Seven is the sixth studio album (seventh overall) by American country rock band Poco. It is the first album they made after leader Richie Furay left the band. The front cover was designed by Phil Hartman. On this album the group experimented with a harder rock sound on some of the tunes.

Release history
In addition to the conventional 2-channel stereo version the album was also released in a 4- channel quadraphonic edition on LP and on 8-track tape in 1974. The quad LP release was encoded with the SQ matrix system.

The album was reissued in the UK on the Super Audio CD format in 2018 by Dutton Vocalion. This edition is a 2-albums-on-1-disc compilation which also contains the followup 1974 Poco album Cantamos. The Dutton Vocalion release contains the complete stereo and quad mixes of both albums.

Reception

In his Allmusic review, music critic Bruce Eder wrote of the album "With strong, soaring harmonies, a healthy balance between acoustic country-rock and heavy rock & roll, and some fairly strong songs, Seven is a major surprise, given that this is the group's first post-Richie Furay album... with one or two additional strong songs, this would be a highly recommended album, and as it is, it's quite good. Unfortunately, not everything here is as strong as "Drivin' Wheel" or "Rocky Mountain Breakdown.""

Track listing
"Drivin' Wheel" (Paul Cotton) – 6:10
"Rocky Mountain Breakdown" (Rusty Young) – 2:16
"Just Call My Name" (Timothy B. Schmit, Noreen Schmit) – 5:12
"Skatin'" (T. Schmit) – 4:42
"Faith in the Families" (Cotton) – 3:43
"Krikkit's Song (Passing Through)" (T. Schmit) – 3:33
"Angel" (Cotton) – 4:55
"You've Got Your Reasons" (Cotton) – 5:14

Personnel
Paul Cotton – vocals, lead and acoustic guitars
Rusty Young – pedal steel guitar, banjo, dobro, rhythm, acoustic and electric guitars
Timothy B. Schmit – vocals, bass guitar 
George Grantham – vocals, drums, percussion
With:
Jim Messina – mandolin on "Rocky Mountain Breakdown"
Burton Cummings – keyboards
Bobbye Hall – congas
Al Garth – fiddle on "Rocky Mountain Breakdown"

References

Poco albums
1974 albums
Albums produced by Jack Richardson (record producer)
Epic Records albums